The 2009 J.League Cup, more widely known as the 2009 J.League Yamazaki Nabisco Cup, is the 34th edition of Japan soccer league cup tournament and the 17th edition under the current J.League Cup format. The championship started on March 25, 2009 and ended on November 3, with F.C. Tokyo defeating Kawasaki Frontale 2-0 in the Final. They qualified for the 2010 Suruga Bank Championship.

Teams from the J1 will take part in the tournament. Kashima Antlers, Kawasaki Frontale, Nagoya Grampus and Gamba Osaka were given a bye to the quarter-final due to the qualification for the AFC Champions League group stage. The rest of 14 will start from the group stage, which divided them into two groups. The group winners and the runners-up of each group will qualify for the quarter-final along with the four teams which qualified for the AFC Champions League.

Group stage

Group A

Group B

Knockout stage 
All times are Japan Standard Time (UTC+9)

Quarter finals

First leg

Second leg

Semi finals

First leg

Second leg

Final

Top goalscorers

Awards 
 MVP: Takuji Yonemoto – FC Tokyo
 New Hero Prize: Takuji Yonemoto – FC Tokyo

See also 
 2009 J.League
 2009 Emperor's Cup

External links 
 J.League Official Site 

2009 domestic association football cups
2009
Lea